Donhauser is a surname. Notable people with the surname include:

Anton Donhauser (1913–1987), German politician
Christian Donhauser (1894–1919), German World War I flying ace
Heinz Donhauser (born 1951), German politician
Toni Donhauser (1921–1990), German politician